This is a comprehensive list of victories of the  cycling team. The races are categorized according to the UCI Continental Circuits rules.

2010 – Sky Professional Cycling

 Overall Bay Cycling Classic, Greg Henderson
Stage 2, Chris Sutton
 Cancer Council Helpline Classic, Greg Henderson
 Stage 6 Tour Down Under, Chris Sutton
 Stage 1 (TTT) Tour of Qatar
  Points classification Tour of Oman, Edvald Boasson Hagen
 Young rider classification, Edvald Boasson Hagen
 Stages 3 & 6, Edvald Boasson Hagen
 Omloop Het Nieuwsblad, Juan Antonio Flecha
 Stage 1 Paris–Nice, Greg Henderson
 Stage 7 Tirreno–Adriatico, Edvald Boasson Hagen
 Stage 2 Critérium International, Russell Downing
 Stage 1 Giro d'Italia, Bradley Wiggins
Led   General classification on Stage 1, Bradley Wiggins
Led  Points classification on stage 1, Bradley Wiggins
  Overall Tour de Picardie, Ben Swift
  Points classification, Ben Swift
  Teams classification
Young rider classification, Ben Swift
Stage 2, Ben Swift
 Stage 7 Critérium du Dauphiné, Edvald Boasson Hagen
 Combativity award  on Stage 13 Tour de France, Juan Antonio Flecha
 Stage 3 Ster Elektrotoer, Greg Henderson
  National Time Trial, Edvald Boasson Hagen
  National Road Race, Geraint Thomas
 Stage 3 Brixia Tour, Chris Sutton
 Overall Tour de Wallonie, Russell Downing
Stage 5, Russell Downing
 Oslo GP, Edvald Boasson Hagen
 Dutch Food Valley Classic, Edvald Boasson Hagen
  Points classification Eneco Tour, Edvald Boasson Hagen
 Stage 4, Edvald Boasson Hagen
  National Time Trial, Bradley Wiggins
  Points classification Tour of Britain, Greg Henderson
Stage 2, Greg Henderson
 Stages 1, 4 & 9 Tour of Southland, Greg Henderson
 Cronulla International Grand Prix Criterium, Chris Sutton

2011 – Sky Procycling

 Sprint classification Bay Classic Series, Simon Gerrans
 Stages 2 & 6 Tour Down Under, Ben Swift
 Stage 3 Volta ao Algarve, Steve Cummings
  Points classification Tour of Oman, Edvald Boasson Hagen
 Kuurne–Brussels–Kuurne, Chris Sutton
 Stage 2 Paris–Nice, Greg Henderson
 Stage 5 Vuelta a Castilla y León, Ben Swift
 Stage 5 Tour de Romandie, Ben Swift
 Tour of California
Stage 2, Ben Swift
Stage 3, Greg Henderson
  Overall Bayern Rundfahrt, Geraint Thomas
 Sprints classification, Edvald Boasson Hagen
Teams classification
Stage 1, Edvald Boasson Hagen
Stage 4, Bradley Wiggins
  Points classification Tour de Luxembourg, Davide Appollonio
Stage 3, Davide Appollonio
 Smithfield Circuit, Alex Dowsett
  Overall Critérium du Dauphiné, Bradley Wiggins
 Stages 6 & 17 Tour de France, Edvald Boasson Hagen
Led Young rider classification on Stages 1–6, Geraint Thomas
Combativity award  on Stage 9, Juan Antonio Flecha
Combativity award  on Stage 12, Geraint Thomas
 Stage 5 Tour of Austria, Ian Stannard
 Porvoon ajot, Kjell Carlström
  National Time Trial, Edvald Boasson Hagen
  National  Road Race, Bradley Wiggins
  National  Time Trial, Alex Dowsett
  National Road Race, Kjell Carlström
 Beaumont Trophy, Bradley Wiggins
 Sandefjord Grand Prix, Edvald Boasson Hagen
 East Yorkshire Classic Roadrace, Jeremy Hunt
  Overall Danmark Rundt, Simon Gerrans
Teams classification
  Overall Eneco Tour, Edvald Boasson Hagen
 Points classification, Edvald Boasson Hagen
 Young rider classification, Edvald Boasson Hagen
 Vattenfall Cyclassics, Edvald Boasson Hagen
  Overall Vuelta a España, Chris Froome
 Combination classification, Chris Froome
Stage 2, Chris Sutton
Stage 17, Chris Froome
Led  General classification on Stage 10, Chris Froome
Led  General classification on Stages 11–14, Bradley Wiggins
Led  Points classification  on Stage 2, Chris Sutton
 Tour du Poitou-Charentes
Stage 1, Davide Appollonio
Stage 5, Alex Dowsett
  Points classification Tour of Britain, Geraint Thomas
Teams classification
 Rund um Sebnitz, Christian Knees
 Stage 8a, Alex Dowsett
 Teams classification Tour de Wallonie-Picarde
 Stage 2, Chris Sutton
 Paris–Bourges, Mathew Hayman
 Teams classification Tour of Beijing
 Overall Cronulla International Grand Prix, Chris Sutton
 Stage 1, Chris Sutton

2012 – Sky Procycling

  Sprints classification Tour Down Under, Edvald Boasson Hagen
 Stages 3 & 5 Tour of Qatar, Mark Cavendish
 Trofeo Deià, Lars Petter Nordhaug
  Overall Volta ao Algarve, Richie Porte
 Points classification, Edvald Boasson Hagen
Teams classification
Stage 2, Edvald Boasson Hagen
Stage 3, Richie Porte
Stage 5, Bradley Wiggins
 Kuurne–Brussels–Kuurne, Mark Cavendish
 Tirreno–Adriatico
Stage 2, Mark Cavendish
Stage 3, Edvald Boasson Hagen
  Overall Paris–Nice, Bradley Wiggins
 Points classification, Bradley Wiggins
Stage 8, Bradley Wiggins
 Stage 4 Volta a Catalunya, Rigoberto Urán
 Teams classification Critérium International
  World Track Championships (Scratch race), Ben Swift
  World Track Championships (Team Pursuit), Geraint Thomas & Peter Kennaugh
  Overall Tour de Romandie, Bradley Wiggins
Team classification
Prologue, Geraint Thomas
Stages 1 & 5, Bradley Wiggins
  Young rider classification Giro d'Italia, Rigoberto Urán
Azzurri d'Italia classification, Mark Cavendish
Combativity classification, Mark Cavendish
Stages 2, 5 & 13, Mark Cavendish
  Overall Glava Tour of Norway, Edvald Boasson Hagen
 Points classification, Edvald Boasson Hagen
 Young rider classification, Edvald Boasson Hagen
Teams classification
Stage 4, Edvald Boasson Hagen
  Overall Bayern Rundfahrt, Michael Rogers
Teams classification
Stages 2 & 4, Michael Rogers
  Overall Critérium du Dauphiné, Bradley Wiggins
Teams classification
Stage 3, Edvald Boasson Hagen
Stage 4, Bradley Wiggins
 London Nocturne, Ian Stannard
  Overall Ster ZLM Toer, Mark Cavendish
  National Road Race, Edvald Boasson Hagen
  National  Road Race, Ian Stannard
  National  Time Trial, Alex Dowsett
  Overall Tour de France, Bradley Wiggins
Stages 2, 18 & 20, Mark Cavendish
Stage 7, Chris Froome
Stages 9 & 19, Bradley Wiggins
Led  Mountains classification on Stage 7, Chris Froome
Led  Team classification on Prologue  – Stage 7
 Neuss Criterium, Christian Knees
 Rhede Criterium, Christian Knees
 Ninove Criterium, Mark Cavendish
 Lacq Audejos Criterium, Mark Cavendish
 Castillon-la-Bataille, Chris Froome
 Profronde van Surhuisterveen, Mark Cavendish
  Olympic Games Individual Time Trial Championship, Bradley Wiggins
  Olympic Games Team pursuit Championship, Geraint Thomas & Peter Kennaugh
  Points classification Tour de Pologne, Ben Swift
Teams classification
Stages 2 & 5, Ben Swift
 Oslo GP, Mark Cavendish
 Teams classification Danmark Rundt
Stage 3, Lars Petter Nordhaug
Combativity award  on Stage 13 Vuelta a España, Juan Antonio Flecha
 GP Ouest-France, Edvald Boasson Hagen
 Stage 1 Tour of Britain, Luke Rowe
 Stages 3, 4 & 8 Tour of Britain, Mark Cavendish
 Wetteren-Wetteren Criterium, Bradley Wiggins
 Grand Prix Cycliste de Montréal, Lars Petter Nordhaug
 Giro del Piemonte, Rigoberto Urán
  Points classification Tour of Beijing, Edvald Boasson Hagen
 Team classification UCI World Tour

2013 – Sky Procycling

  Sprints classification Tour Down Under, Geraint Thomas
Stage 2, Geraint Thomas
 Combativity award Stage 6, Geraint Thomas
  Overall Tour of Oman, Chris Froome
 Points classification, Chris Froome
Stage 5, Chris Froome
 Stage 3 Volta ao Algarve, Sergio Henao
  Overall  Paris–Nice, Richie Porte
Stages 5 & 7, Richie Porte
 Stage 4 Tirreno–Adriatico, Chris Froome
  Overall Critérium International, Chris Froome
 Points classification, Richie Porte
Stage 2 (ITT), Richie Porte
Stage 3, Chris Froome
  Points classification  Tour of the Basque Country, Sergio Henao
Stage 3, Sergio Henao
Stage 5, Richie Porte
 Stage 1b (TTT) Giro del Trentino
 Stage 2 Giro del Trentino, Kanstantsin Sivtsov
  Overall Tour de Romandie, Chris Froome
Team classification
Prologue, Chris Froome
 Trofeo Fast Team  Giro d'Italia
Stage 2 (TTT)
Stage 10, Rigoberto Urán
Led  General classification on Stage 2, Salvatore Puccio
Led  Young rider classification on Stage 2, Salvatore Puccio
 Lincoln GP, Peter Kennaugh
  Overall Tour of Norway, Edvald Boasson Hagen
 Points classification, Edvald Boasson Hagen
Stage 4, Edvald Boasson Hagen
   Overall Critérium du Dauphiné, Chris Froome
Team classification
Stage 3, Edvald Boasson Hagen
Stage 5, Chris Froome
  National Time Trial, Edvald Boasson Hagen
  National Time Trial, Kanstantsin Sivtsov
  Overall Tour de France, Chris Froome
Stages 8, 15 & 17 (ITT), Chris Froome
Led  Mountains classification, on Stage 8 & 15–19 Chris Froome
 Aalst Criterium, Chris Froome
 Profronde van Stiphout, Chris Froome
 Sint-Niklaas Criterium, Chris Froome
 Lacq Audejos Criterium, Richie Porte
 Marcolès Criterium, Richie Porte
 Stage 7 (ITT) Tour de Pologne, Bradley Wiggins
 Etten-Leur Criterium, Chris Froome
 Stage 6 Eneco Tour, David López
 Stage 18 Vuelta a España, Vasil Kiryienka
 Combativity award  Stage 19 Vuelta a España, Edvald Boasson Hagen
  Overall Tour of Britain, Bradley Wiggins
Teams classification
Stage 3 (ITT) Tour of Britain, Bradley Wiggins
 Saitama Criterium, Chris Froome
 Elimination Race Revolution (Round 1), Luke Rowe

2014 – Team Sky

 Points Race Revolution (Round 3), Peter Kennaugh
 Stage 5 Tour Down Under, Richie Porte
 Points Race Revolution (Round 4), Peter Kennaugh
 Scratch Race Revolution (Round 4), Ben Swift
  Overall Tour of Oman, Chris Froome
 Team classification 
Stage 5, Chris Froome
 Omloop Het Nieuwsblad, Ian Stannard
  Overall Settimana Internazionale di Coppi e Bartali, Peter Kennaugh
 Points classification, Ben Swift
Team classification
Stage 1a, Ben Swift
Stage 1b (TTT)
Stage 2, Peter Kennaugh
Stage 4 (ITT), Dario Cataldo
 Stage 5 Tour of the Basque Country, Ben Swift
  Overall Tour de Romandie, Chris Froome
Stage 5 (ITT), Chris Froome
 Giro d'Italia
Cima Coppi, Dario Cataldo
Led Trofeo Super Team on Stage 3
  Overall  Tour of California, Bradley Wiggins
Stage 2 (ITT), Bradley Wiggins
  Overall Bayern Rundfahrt, Geraint Thomas
Stage 4 (ITT), Geraint Thomas
  Points classification Critérium du Dauphiné, Chris Froome
Stages 1 (ITT) & 2, Chris Froome
Stage 8, Mikel Nieve
  National Time Trial, Kanstantsin Sivtsov
  National  Road Race, Peter Kennaugh
  National  Time Trial, Bradley Wiggins
 Tour de France
Combativity award  Stage 18, Mikel Nieve
Led  Teams classification on Stages 1– 4
  Overall Tour of Austria, Peter Kennaugh
 Points classification, Peter Kennaugh
Stage 1, Peter Kennaugh
 Bischofhofen Criterium, Bernhard Eisel
 Commonwealth Games Road Race, Geraint Thomas
 Stage 8a (ITT) Tour of Britain, Bradley Wiggins
   Overall Combativity award Vuelta a España, Chris Froome
  World Time Trial Championships, Bradley Wiggins
 Japan Cup Criterium, Christopher Sutton

2015 – Team Sky

  National Time Trial, Richie Porte
 Stage 5 Tour Down Under, Richie Porte
 Stage 2 Dubai Tour, Elia Viviani
  Overall Vuelta a Andalucía, Chris Froome
Stage 4, Chris Froome
 Points classification, Chris Froome
Team classification
  Overall Volta ao Algarve, Geraint Thomas
 Mountains classification, Richie Porte
 Points classification, Geraint Thomas
Stage 2, Geraint Thomas
Stage 4,  Richie Porte
 Omloop Het Nieuwsblad, Ian Stannard
  Overall Paris–Nice, Richie Porte
Teams classification
Stages 4 & 7 (ITT), Richie Porte
 Stage 4 Tirreno–Adriatico, Wout Poels
 E3 Harelbeke, Geraint Thomas
  Points classification Settimana Internazionale di Coppi e Bartali, Ben Swift
Teams classification
Stage 2, Ben Swift
  Overall Volta a Catalunya, Richie Porte
 Stage 3b (ITT) Three Days of De Panne, Bradley Wiggins
  Overall Giro del Trentino, Richie Porte
Stage 2, Richie Porte
 Stage 1 Tour de Romandie, Team time trial
  Overall Tour de Yorkshire, Lars Petter Nordhaug
 Points classification, Lars Petter Nordhaug
Teams classification
Stage 1, Lars Petter Nordhaug
 Giro d'Italia
Stage 2, Elia Viviani
Stage 14 (ITT), Vasil Kiryienka
Led  Points classification on Stages 2–5, 7–9, 13, Elia Viviani
  Overall Critérium du Dauphiné, Chris Froome
Stage 1, Peter Kennaugh
Stages 7 & 8, Chris Froome
 Team classification Tour de Suisse
  National Time Trial, Vasil Kiryienka
  National Road Race, Peter Kennaugh
 European Games Individual Time Trial, Vasil Kiryienka
  Overall Tour de France, Chris Froome
 Mountains classification, Chris Froome
Stage 10, Chris Froome
Led  Teams classification on Stages 10–11
 Stage 6 Tour de Pologne, Sergio Henao
 Stage 1 Eneco Tour, Elia Viviani
 Stage 18 Vuelta a España, Nicolas Roche
Led Team classification on Stages 2–17
 Stages 1 & 3 Tour of Britain, Elia Viviani
 Stage 5 Tour of Britain, Wout Poels
  World Time Trial Championships, Vasil Kiryienka
  Points classification Abu Dhabi Tour, Elia Viviani
Stages 2 & 4, Elia Viviani
 Chrono des Nations, Vasil Kiryienka
  European Omnium, Elia Viviani

2016 – Team Sky

  Mountains classification Tour Down Under, Sergio Henao
 Cadel Evans Great Ocean Road Race, Peter Kennaugh
  Overall Volta a la Comunitat Valenciana, Wout Poels
 Points classification, Wout Poels
 Mountains classification, Wout Poels
Teams classification
Stages 1 & 4, Wout Poels
  Overall Herald Sun Tour, Chris Froome
 Mountains classification, Chris Froome
 Team classification
Stage 1, Peter Kennaugh
Stage 4, Chris Froome
 Stage 2 Dubai Tour, Elia Viviani
  Points classification Vuelta a Andalucía, Ben Swift
  Overall Volta ao Algarve, Geraint Thomas
  Overall Paris–Nice, Geraint Thomas
 Stage 5 Volta a Catalunya, Wout Poels
 E3 Harelbeke, Michał Kwiatkowski
  Sprints classification Three Days of De Panne, Danny van Poppel
Stage 2, Elia Viviani
  Points classification Tour of the Basque Country, Sergio Henao
Teams classification
Stage 2, Mikel Landa
  Overall Giro del Trentino, Mikel Landa 
 Mountains classification, Mikel Landa 
Stage 2, Mikel Landa 
 Liège–Bastogne–Liège, Wout Poels 
 Stage 4 Tour de Romandie, Chris Froome
 Combativity award Stage 5
 Stage 2 Tour de Yorkshire, Danny van Poppel
  Mountains classification Giro d'Italia, Mikel Nieve
Stage 13, Mikel Nieve
  Overall Critérium du Dauphiné, Chris Froome
 Team classification 
Stage 5, Chris Froome
  National Time Trial, Leopold König
  National Time Trial, Nicolas Roche
  National Road Race, Nicolas Roche
  Overall Tour de France, Chris Froome
Stages 8 & 18 (ITT), Chris Froome
 Aalst Criterium, Chris Froome
  Points classification Vuelta a Burgos, Danny van Poppel
Stages 1 & 3, Danny van Poppel
  Overall Arctic Race of Norway, Gianni Moscon
 Youth classification, Gianni Moscon
Teams classification
Stage 2, Danny van Poppel
Stage 3, Gianni Moscon
  Olympic Games Track Championships (Omnium), Elia Viviani
 Vuelta a España
Stage 1 (TTT)
Stages 11 & 19 (ITT), Chris Froome
 Stage 12 Combativity award, David López
 Stage 19 Combativity award, Chris Froome
Led  General classification on Stage 1, Peter Kennaugh
Led  General classification on Stage 2, Michał Kwiatkowski
 Tour of Britain
Stage 3, Ian Stannard
Stage 6, Wout Poels
Teams classification
 Stage 2 Combativity award, Nicolas Roche
 Stage 3 Combativity award, Ian Stannard
 Chrono des Nations, Vasil Kiryienka

2017 – Team Sky

 Team classification Herald Sun Tour
 Most aggressive rider Stage 2, Luke Rowe
Prologue, Danny van Poppel
Stage 1, Luke Rowe
Stage 4, Ian Stannard
  National Road Race, Sergio Henao
 Strade Bianche, Michał Kwiatkowski
 Stage 2 Tirreno–Adriatico, Geraint Thomas
  Overall Paris–Nice, Sergio Henao
 Milan–San Remo, Michał Kwiatkowski
  Overall Tour of the Alps, Geraint Thomas
Stage 3, Geraint Thomas
 Stage 3 Tour de Romandie, Elia Viviani
 Teams classification Tour of California
Stage 6 (ITT), Jonathan Dibben
  Mountains classification Giro d'Italia, Mikel Landa
Stage 19, Mikel Landa
Cima Coppi, Mikel Landa
Premio Combattività, Mikel Landa
 Overall, Hammer Series
 Stage 7 Critérium du Dauphiné, Peter Kennaugh
 Stage 2 Route du Sud, Elia Viviani
  National Time Trial, Michał Kwiatkowski
  National Time Trial, Gianni Moscon
  Overall Tour de France, Chris Froome
 Team classification
Stage 1 (ITT), Geraint Thomas
Led  General classification Stages 1-4, Geraint Thomas
Led  Points classification Stage 2, Geraint Thomas
 Clásica de San Sebastián, Michał Kwiatkowski
  Mountains classification Tour de Pologne, Diego Rosa
Stage 5, Danny van Poppel
Stage 7, Wout Poels
  Overall Vuelta a Burgos, Mikel Landa
 Points classification, Mikel Landa
 Mountains classification, Mikel Landa
Spanish rider classification, Mikel Landa
Stages 1 & 3, Mikel Landa
 EuroEyes Cyclassics, Elia Viviani
  Overall Vuelta a España, Chris Froome
 Points classification, Chris Froome
 Combination classification, Chris Froome
Stages 9 & 16 (ITT), Chris Froome
 Stage 16 Combativity award, Chris Froome
  Points classification Tour du Poitou-Charentes, Elia Viviani
Stages 1 & 3, Elia Viviani
 GP Ouest-France, Elia Viviani
 Stage 2 Tour of Britain, Elia Viviani
Team classification, UCI World Tour

2018 – Team Sky

  Youth classification, Tour Down Under, Egan Bernal
  National Time Trial, Egan Bernal
  National Road Race, Sergio Henao
  Overall Colombia Oro y Paz, Egan Bernal
 Mountains classification, Egan Bernal
 Youth classification, Egan Bernal
Team classification
  Points classification Vuelta a Andalucía, Wout Poels
Stage 2 Vuelta a Andalucía, Wout Poels
Stage 5 (ITT), David de la Cruz
  Overall, Volta ao Algarve, Michał Kwiatkowski
 Points classification, Michał Kwiatkowski
Teams classification
Stages 2 & 5, Michał Kwiatkowski
Stage 3 (ITT), Geraint Thomas
 Paris–Nice
Stage 4 (ITT), Wout Poels
Stage 8, David de la Cruz
  Overall Tirreno–Adriatico, Michał Kwiatkowski
  Overall Settimana Internazionale di Coppi e Bartali, Diego Rosa
 Points classification, Chris Lawless
 Young rider classification, Pavel Sivakov
Stage 1b (TTT) 
Stage 3, Chris Lawless
  Youth classification Tour de Romandie, Egan Bernal
Stage 3 (ITT), Egan Bernal
  Overall Tour of California, Egan Bernal
 Youth classification, Egan Bernal
Team classification 
Stages 2 & 5, Egan Bernal
  Overall Giro d'Italia, Chris Froome
 Mountains classification, Chris Froome
Stages 14 & 19, Chris Froome
Cima Coppi, Chris Froome
Team classification
 Overall Critérium du Dauphiné, Geraint Thomas
Team classification
Prologue, Michał Kwiatkowski
Stage 3 (TTT)
  National Time Trial, Jonathan Castroviejo
  National Road Race, Michał Kwiatkowski
  National Time Trial, Dylan van Baarle
  National Time Trial, Geraint Thomas
  National Time Trial, Vasil Kiryienka
  Overall Tour de France, Geraint Thomas
Stages 11 & 12, Geraint Thomas
  Overall Tour de Pologne, Michał Kwiatkowski
Stages 4 & 5, Michał Kwiatkowski
 Vuelta a España
Lead  General classification on Stages 3–5, Michał Kwiatkowski
Lead  Points classification on Stages 3–7, Michał Kwiatkowski
Lead ] Combined classification on Stages 3–5 & 7, Michał Kwiatkowski
Lead Teams classification on Stages 3–4
 Stage 14 Combativity award, Michał Kwiatkowski
 Stage 19 Combativity award, Jonathan Castroviejo
 Tour of Britain
Stage 6, Wout Poels
Stage 7, Ian Stannard
Stage 7 Combativity award, Ian Stannard
Stage 8 Combativity award, Vasil Kiryienka
 Coppa Ugo Agostoni, Gianni Moscon
 Giro della Toscana, Gianni Moscon
  National Time Trial, Gianni Moscon
  Overall Tour of Guangxi, Gianni Moscon
Stage 4, Gianni Moscon
 Young rider classification Gianni Moscon
Stage 3 Combativity award, Owain Doull

2019 – Team Sky / Team Ineos

  Overall Herald Sun Tour, Dylan van Baarle
 Mountains classification, Christian Knees
 Youth classification, Pavel Sivakov
Team classification
Stage 3, Owain Doull
Stage 5, Kristoffer Halvorsen
 Stage 4 combativity award, Dylan van Baarle
 Stage 1, Tour La Provence, Filippo Ganna
  Mountains classification, Tour Colombia, Iván Sosa
  World Track Championships (Individual Pursuit), Filippo Ganna
  Overall Paris–Nice, Egan Bernal
 Points classification, Michał Kwiatkowski
 Youth classification, Egan Bernal
Team classification
  Overall Tour of the Alps, Pavel Sivakov
 Youth classification, Pavel Sivakov
Team classification
Stages 1 & 4, Tao Geoghegan Hart
Stage 2, Pavel Sivakov
  Overall Tour de Yorkshire, Chris Lawless
 Points classification, Chris Lawless
Team classification
 Giro d'Italia
Led  Youth classification on Stages 14-16, Pavel Sivakov
 Stage 6 Tour of Norway, Kristoffer Halvorsen
 Youth classification, Kristoffer Halvorsen
 Critérium du Dauphiné
Stage 7, Wout Poels
Stage 8, Dylan van Baarle
  Overall Tour de Suisse, Egan Bernal
Stage 7, Egan Bernal
 Youth classification, Egan Bernal
  Youth classification Route d'Occitanie, Iván Sosa
Stage 3, Iván Sosa
  European Games, Time trial, Vasil Kiryienka
  National Time Trial, Filippo Ganna
  National Time Trial, Jonathan Castroviejo
  National Road Race, Ben Swift
  Overall Tour de France, Egan Bernal
 Young rider classification, Egan Bernal
  Young rider classification Tour de Wallonie, Chris Lawless
Team classification
  Overall Tour de Pologne, Pavel Sivakov
Team classification
  Vuelta a Burgos, Iván Sosa
 Mountains classification, Iván Sosa
 Youth classification, Iván Sosa
Team classification
Stages 3 & 5, Iván Sosa
 Stage 6 (ITT), BinckBank Tour, Filippo Ganna
  Vuelta a España
 Stage 8 combativity award, David de la Cruz
 Stage 20 combativity award, Tao Geoghegan Hart
 Overall combativity award Tour of Britain, Dylan van Baarle
Stage 4 combativity award, Dylan van Baarle
Stage 8 combativity award, Pavel Sivakov
Team classification
 Gran Piemonte, Egan Bernal

2020 – Team Ineos / Ineos Grenadiers

  Young Rider classification, Tour Down Under, Pavel Sivakov
Team classification
 Stage 3 Combativity award, Tour Colombia, Sebastián Henao
 Stage 4 Tour de la Provence, Owain Doull 
 Team classification, Volta ao Algarve
  World Track Championships (Individual Pursuit), Filippo Ganna
 Stage 5 Vuelta a Burgos, Iván Sosa
  Overall Route d'Occitanie, Egan Bernal
 Points classification, Egan Bernal
 Young rider classification, Egan Bernal
Stage 3, Egan Bernal
 Stage 3 Tour de Pologne, Richard Carapaz
  National Time Trial, Filippo Ganna
  Overall Settimana Internazionale di Coppi e Bartali, Jhonatan Narváez
 Points classification, Jhonatan Narváez
 Young rider classification, Jhonatan Narváez
Stage 3, Jhonatan Narváez
 Stage 8, Tirreno–Adriatico, Filippo Ganna
 Tour de France
Stage 18, Michał Kwiatkowski
 Stage 16 combativity award, Richard Carapaz
 Giro dell'Appennino, Ethan Hayter
  World Championships – Time Trial, Filippo Ganna
  Overall Giro d'Italia, Tao Geoghegan Hart
 Young rider classification, Tao Geoghegan Hart
Stages 1 (ITT), 5, 14 (ITT) & 21 (ITT), Filippo Ganna
Stage 12, Jhonatan Narváez
Stages 15 & 20, Tao Geoghegan Hart
Team classification
Cima Coppi, Rohan Dennis

2021 – Ineos Grenadiers

Stages 4 & 5 (ITT) Étoile de Bessèges, Filippo Ganna
 Overall Tour de la Provence, Iván Sosa
Stage 3, Iván Sosa
Stage 2 (ITT) UAE Tour, Filippo Ganna
 Overall Volta a Catalunya, Adam Yates
 Teams classification
Stage 2 (ITT), Rohan Dennis
Stage 3, Adam Yates
Stage 3 Settimana Internazionale di Coppi e Bartali, Ethan Hayter
Dwars door Vlaanderen, Dylan van Baarle
Brabantse Pijl, Tom Pidcock
Stages 1 & 3 Tour of the Alps, Gianni Moscon
 Overall Tour de Romandie, Geraint Thomas
 Teams classification
Prologue, Rohan Dennis
Stage 2 Volta ao Algarve, Ethan Hayter
  Overall Giro d'Italia, Egan Bernal
 Young rider classification, Egan Bernal
Stages 1 (ITT) & 21 (ITT), Filippo Ganna
Stages 9 & 16, Egan Bernal
Cima Coppi, Egan Bernal
Stages 2 & 5 Vuelta a Andalucía, Ethan Hayter
 Overall Critérium du Dauphiné, Richie Porte
 Teams classification
Stage 5, Geraint Thomas
 Overall Tour de Suisse, Richard Carapaz
Stage 5, Richard Carapaz
 Young rider classification, Eddie Dunbar
Gran Premio di Lugano, Gianni Moscon
 Olympic Road Race, Richard Carapaz
 Olympic Team pursuit, Filippo Ganna
 Olympic Cross-country, Tom Pidcock
 Overall Tour of Norway, Ethan Hayter
Stages 1 & 2, Ethan Hayter
Stage 3 (TTT) Tour of Britain
Stage 5 Tour of Britain, Ethan Hayter
  Team relay, European Road Championships, Filippo Ganna
 Time Trial, UCI Road World Championships, Filippo Ganna
  National Time Trial, Ethan Hayter
  National Criterium Championships, Ethan Hayter
  National Road Race, Ben Swift
 Team pursuit, UCI Track Cycling World Championships, Filippo Ganna
 Omnium, UCI Track Cycling World Championships, Ethan Hayter 
UCI World Cup Rucphen, Tom Pidcock

2022 – Ineos Grenadiers

UCI World Cup Hulst, Tom Pidcock
Hexia Cyclocross Gullegem, Tom Pidcock
  National Road Race, Luke Plapp
 Men's elite race, UCI Cyclo-cross World Championships, Tom Pidcock
Stage 5 (ITT) Étoile de Bessèges, Filippo Ganna
  National Time Trial, Daniel Martínez
Prologue Tour de la Provence, Filippo Ganna
Stage 1 Tour de la Provence, Elia Viviani
  National Time Trial, Richard Carapaz
Stage 3 Vuelta a Andalucía, Magnus Sheffield
Stage 1 (ITT) Tirreno–Adriatico, Filippo Ganna
 Overall Settimana Internazionale di Coppi e Bartali, Eddie Dunbar
 Points classification, Ethan Hayter
 Youth classification, Ben Tulett
Team classification
Stage 2, Ethan Hayter
Stage 3, Ben Tulett
Stage 6 Volta a Catalunya, Richard Carapaz
 Overall Tour of the Basque Country, Daniel Martínez
 Points classification, Daniel Martínez
 Team classification
Stage 4, Daniel Martínez
Stage 5, Carlos Rodríguez
Amstel Gold Race, Michał Kwiatkowski
Brabantse Pijl, Magnus Sheffield
Paris–Roubaix, Dylan van Baarle
Prologue & Stage 2 Tour de Romandie, Ethan Hayter
 Overall Tour de Hongrie, Eddie Dunbar
UCI XCO World Cup Albstadt, Tom Pidcock 
UCI XCO World Cup Nové Město, Tom Pidcock 
Stage 4 (ITT) Critérium du Dauphiné, Filippo Ganna
 Overall Tour de Suisse, Geraint Thomas
  National Time Trial, Filippo Ganna
  National Time Trial, Ethan Hayter
  National Road Race, Carlos Rodríguez
Stage 12 Tour de France, Tom Pidcock
 Overall Tour de Pologne, Ethan Hayter
 Overall Vuelta a Burgos, Pavel Sivakov
Stage 2 (ITT) Danmark Rundt, Magnus Sheffield
 UEC European XCO Championships, Tom Pidcock 
 Overall Deutschland Tour, Adam Yates
Prologue, Filippo Ganna
Stage 3, Adam Yates
 Mountains classification Vuelta a España, Richard Carapaz
Stages 12, 14 & 20, Richard Carapaz
Coppa Sabatini, Daniel Martínez
Stage 6 CRO Race, Elia Viviani

2023 – Ineos Grenadiers

  National Road Race, Luke Plapp
 Stage 4 Volta a la Comunitat Valenciana, Tao Geoghegan Hart
 Vuelta a Murcia, Ben Turner
 Overall Volta ao Algarve, Daniel Martinez
 Stage 4, Tom Pidcock
 Stage 5 Vuelta a Andalucia Ruta Ciclista Del Sol, Omar Fraile

Supplementary statistics

Season stats

Gallery

Notes

References

External links

Sky
wins